Aniki-Bóbó is a 1942 Portuguese film directed by Manoel de Oliveira. It is his first feature-length film. The actors are mostly children from Oliveira's hometown, Porto. The script was adapted by Manoel de Oliveira from a short story by José Rodrigues de Freitas, Meninos Milionários (lit. Millionaire Children). Aniki-Bóbó is a rhyme from a children's game, akin to Eeny, meeny, miny, moe.

The film was not very well received, but with time it gained recognition and was finally accepted as one of the most important Portuguese films of its time. In several respects, this film seems to anticipate Italian neorealism. It would be 21 years before Oliveira directed his next feature film.

References

Sources

External links 
 

1942 films
1942 drama films
1940s Portuguese-language films
Portuguese black-and-white films
Films directed by Manoel de Oliveira
Portuguese drama films
Films shot in Portugal